The Cochetopa Hills are a ridge of uplands on the Continental Divide in Saguache County, southern Colorado, United States.

Geography
The Cochetopa Hills ridge bridges the southern terminus of the Sawatch Range to the northern terminus of the La Garita Mountains of the San Juan Mountains System. The Sawatch Range to the northeast and the La Garita Mountains to the south are characterized by higher peaks.

On USGS topographic maps, the area labeled Cochetopa Hills is roughly bounded by  Antora Peak, the town of Sargents, the drainage of Cochetopa Creek, and the town of Saguache. North Pass on State Highway 114 and the backcountry Cochetopa Pass allow travel on Colorado State Highway 114 from the upper Rio Grande drainage on the east to the upper Gunnison River drainage on the west.

The practice of naming mid-elevation upland areas in central and southern Colorado using the word hills is also illustrated by the naming of the similar uplands the Arkansas Hills, between the upper Arkansas Valley and South Park.

See also

References

External links 

Ridges of Colorado
Mountains of Saguache County, Colorado
Ranges of the Rocky Mountains
San Juan Mountains (Colorado)